Pickin' My Way is the forty-first studio album by guitarist Chet Atkins. It reached number 13 on the Billboard Country charts. The liner notes are by Johnny Cash.

Reissues
 In 1989, RCA/Mobile Fidelity Sound Labs re-released Pickin' My Way, Chet Atkins in Hollywood and Alone in a double CD set.

Track listing

Side one
 "Lover, Come Back to Me" (Sigmund Romberg, Oscar Hammerstein II) – 3:23
 "The Boxer" (Paul Simon) – 3:46
 "Hellacious" – 2:44
 "I Never Knew" – 2:13
 "Wabash Blues" – 3:02

Side two
 "Black Mountain Rag" – 2:40
 "Junk" (Paul McCartney) – 2:13
 "When You Wish upon a Star" (Ned Washington, Leigh Harline) – 3:09
 "Floatin' Down to Cotton Town" (Harold G. Frost, Henri F. Kickman) – 2:22
 "Pickin' My Way" (Shirley Eikhard)– 2:18

Personnel
Chet Atkins – guitar
Production notes
Produced by Chet Atkins and Jerry Reed
Bill Vandervort – engineer
Tom Pick – engineer
Mike Shockley  – recording technician
Ray Butts – recording technician
Dick Cobb – cover photo

External links
Chet Atkins Official Site discography

1970 albums
Chet Atkins albums
Albums produced by Chet Atkins
RCA Victor albums